Dulcie Wood is a South African former cricketer who played as a wicket-keeper. She appeared in one Test match for South Africa in 1961, against England. She played domestic cricket for Southern Transvaal.

She made appearances against England during the 1960–61 tour for both South African XI and Southern Transvaal before replacing Patricia Klesser as wicket-keeper for the fourth Test. After scoring ducks in both the tour matches, she batted at number ten in the Test match. She scored three runs before South Africa declared; the match ended a draw.

References

External links
 
 

Living people
Date of birth missing (living people)
Year of birth missing (living people)
Place of birth missing (living people)
South African women cricketers
South Africa women Test cricketers
Central Gauteng women cricketers
Wicket-keepers